The Big 12 Conference is a group of 10 (originally 12) universities which compete in the NCAA Division I level.  The conference was formed in 1994 but did not begin conference play until the fall of 1996.  The schools that compose the Big 12 Conference, except West Virginia, were members of either the Big Eight Conference or the Southwest Conference, and have won six national titles including three titles since the inception of the Big 12 Conference.

Membership

Current members
Departing members highlighted in pink.

Future members

Former members

Standings

All-time records

Totals though the end of the 2021-22 season.

Overall series records in Big 12 Play

Totals though the end of the 2021-2022 season. Includes any regular season or postseason meetings when both members were part of the Big 12.

All Time Series Record

Totals though the end of the 2021-22 season. Includes any regular season or postseason meetings.

Conference Tournament

Player of the Year

NCAA tournament

Totals though the end of the 2021-22 season.

Home Court Record (Current Arena)

Totals though the end of the 2021–22 season. Texas moved from the Frank Erwin Center, its home since 1977, to the new Moody Center after the 2021–22 season, ending its tenure at the former venue with a 548–143 record.

Conference by Year 
Totals highlighted in bold signify a first place/championship finish.

References